Alexandre Galopin (26 September 1879 – 28 February 1944) was a Belgian businessman notable for his role in German-occupied Belgium during World War II. Galopin was director of the Société Générale de Belgique, a major Belgian company, and chairman of the board of the motor and armaments company Fabrique Nationale d'Armes de Guerre (FN). At the head of a group of Belgian industrialists and financiers, he gave his name to the "Galopin Doctrine" which prescribed how Belgian industry should deal with the moral and economic choices imposed by the occupation. In February 1944, he was assassinated by Flemish collaborators from the DeVlag group.

Early career
Alexandre Galopin was born in Ghent, East Flanders in Belgium on 28 September 1879. His father was a university professor. Galopin pursued a career in business became in 1913 managing director of Fabrique national d'armes de guerre at Herstal which had originated as a manufacturer of firearms. He championed its development into an important manufacturer of motor vehicles in Belgium. In 1935 he became governor of the Société Générale de Belgique (SGB), a giant holding company with close ties to the Belgian government which dominated the economy of Belgium and its colonial empire and controlled almost 40 percent of the country's industrial production.

World War II
Belgium was invaded by Nazi Germany on 10 May 1940. At the start of the German occupation, Galopin was made chairman of an informal group, dubbed the "Galopin Committee", which convened senior figures in Belgian economic life, notably representatives of major holding companies, banks, and industry. The committee had been set up by the Belgian government, shortly before it left the country, on 15 May 1940. It served as a sort of a Belgian shadow government in the occupied territory that decided a common stance on economic and social issues and was able to set rules for dealing with the German administration. The committee included politicians and businessmen:
, banker and chairman of the Banque de Bruxelles
Fernand Collin, banker and chairman of Kredietbank
, head of the  department store chain
Willy de Munck, Chairman of the 
Albert Goffin, official at the National Bank of Belgium and, from 1941, its governor
Léon Bekaert, industrialist
Albert-Edouard Janssen, Chairman of the Société Générale de Belgique and former finance minister
, Catholic Party ex-minister and lawyer
Emile van Dievoet, Catholic Party ex-minister and law professor

Because of his power and influence within the Belgian wartime economy, Galopin was nicknamed "the Uncrowned King of Belgium" by German occupation officials.

Galopin doctrine

Part of the goal of the Galopin committee was to keep Belgian industry strong during the war to avoid leaving the economy crippled once the war ended. To that end, Galopin gave his name to a controversial policy known as the "Galopin doctrine" (Doctrine Galopin). Under that plan, Belgian companies should continue production under German occupation provided that they were producing goods for Belgium's civilian population (such as food or consumer goods) even if it would benefit the German war industry by relieving it from the need to export similar goods. However, Belgian companies should refuse to produce war materiel or goods that were directly usable in the German war effort.

The aim of the policy was to prevent a repeat of the economic destruction which had accompanied the German occupation of Belgium during World War I, when workers and businessmen had been encouraged to resist German demands. That had led to the deportation of Belgian workers to Germany in 1916 and the confiscation of capital from firms, which was also sent to Germany. The policy had, in turn, caused unemployment and inflation that continued to damage the Belgian economy for years after the war. Limited co-operation with the German occupiers in non-military production was hoped to limit the war's effects on the Belgian economy and to facilitate post-war economic recovery. It was therefore an extension of a similar policy of "lesser evil" (moindre mal) adopted by Belgian civil servants through the Committee of Secretaries-General. Initially, it was also supported by the Belgian government in exile.

In practice, the distinction between the limited co-operation in the Galopin doctrine and outright collaboration proved difficult to maintain. It was widely perceived as a form of collaborationism in the Belgian population. After some initial acceptance, in 1941 and 1942, German officers began to force Belgian businessmen to disapply the distinction at the risk of personal punishment and the confiscation of their businesses. In 1942, the occupation administration began to deport Belgian workers as forced labourers in Germany as during World War I. However, it has been argued that the co-operative approach represented by the doctrine did prevent German companies from expanding their control over the Belgian economy.

The Galopin doctrine was similar to the policy of "co-operation" (samenwerken) in the German-occupied Netherlands and overseen by senior civil servants such as Hans Hirschfeld.

Assassination
Galopin was assassinated in 1944 by members of Devlag, a radical pro-Nazi paramilitary group active in Flanders, under direct orders from Robert Jan Verbelen. Galopin's name has been given to a street: avenue Alexandre Galopin in Etterbeek, Brussels.

See also

Committee of Secretaries-General
Social Pact
Strike of the 100,000

References

Bibliography

Further reading
 

1879 births
1944 deaths
Businesspeople from Ghent
Nobility from Ghent
Société Générale de Belgique
Belgian people of World War II
Assassinated Belgian people
Belgian civilians killed in World War II
People murdered in Belgium